Russell Jones (born 1978 in Bangor, Gwynedd, North Wales) is a Welsh actor and musician. He was educated at Ysgol y Creuddyn and Aberystwyth University's Department of Theatre, Film and Television Studies.

He embarked on an acting career in 1999 with various roles in small scale theatre all over the UK.  In 2001 he landed one of the lead roles in the Welsh language drama series Tipyn o Stad playing the shady Laurence "Stud" Williams for S4C, a role he played for 4 years.

He has since been seen in the UK horror films The Zombie Diaries (2006) and World of the Dead: The Zombie Diaries (2011) playing the character Goke. He played Tom in the crime thriller NightDragon.

Other appearances include Casualty (episode 407, Can't Let Go, 18 October 2003, playing "Max Hart") and as a policeman in an episode of Torchwood, other roles  include Roger in Caerdydd for S4C as well as various short films, productions and radio plays.

In late 2011 Jones formed the indie band Cherry White, his duties in the band are that of main songwriter, guitarist, occasional singer and band leader. Having started as a blues band they quickly progressed to span rock, pop and jazz with original material that explore the dark sides of society while retaining an uplifting and powerful musical identity.

References

External links 
 

1978 births
Living people
Welsh male stage actors
Welsh male television actors